Oreocalamus is a genus of snake in the superfamily Colubroidea  that contains the sole species Oreocalamus hanitschi. It is commonly known as Hanitsch's reed snake, Kalimantan burrowing snake, or mountain reed snake.

It is found in Malaysia.

References 

Colubrids
Reptiles described in 1899
Monotypic snake genera